Lutovico Halagahu (born 21 July 1967) is a paralympic athlete from France competing mainly in category F44 throwing events.

Lutovico has competed in two Paralympics, his first in 1996 he competed in the discus throw, won a silver in the javelin throw and a gold medal in the shot put.  Four years later in the 2000 Summer Paralympics he defended his shot put gold medal and won a bronze in the discus throw.

At the 2015 Pacific Games in Port Moresby he won bronze in the javelin throw.

In September 1996 he was appointed a Chevalier of the Legion of Honour for his paralympic sporting activities. In November 2000 he was made an Officer of the Ordre national du Mérite.

References

External links 
 

Paralympic athletes of France
Athletes (track and field) at the 1996 Summer Paralympics
Athletes (track and field) at the 2000 Summer Paralympics
Paralympic gold medalists for France
Paralympic silver medalists for France
Paralympic bronze medalists for France
Living people
Medalists at the 1996 Summer Paralympics
Medalists at the 2000 Summer Paralympics
1967 births
Paralympic medalists in athletics (track and field)
French male discus throwers
French male javelin throwers
French male shot putters
Wallis and Futuna javelin throwers
Discus throwers with limb difference
Javelin throwers with limb difference
Shot putters with limb difference
Paralympic discus throwers
Paralympic javelin throwers
Paralympic shot putters
Chevaliers of the Légion d'honneur
Officers of the Ordre national du Mérite